Grayrigg Forest is a hill in Cumbria, England, located on the eastern edge of what might be considered the Lake District, and in August 2016 becoming part of the national park.

From near the summit, there are impressive views down into the gorge of the Lune valley, where road, West Coast Main Line railway, M6 motorway and River Lune crowd between the outliers of the Lake District and the Howgill Fells.

It is one of three summits, along with Winterscleugh and Whinfell Beacon, added to the list of Fellrangers in the new edition (2019-2021) of Mark Richards' eight volumes of guidebooks and bringing the total to 230. They were added when the Lake District National Park boundary was extended in 2019, including them for the first time.

References

Marilyns of England
Fells of the Lake District